Rally Bike is a racing arcade video game originally developed by Toaplan and published by Taito in May 1988. In Rally Bike, players compete against computer-controlled opponents in races across locations in the United States. Initially released in arcades, the game was ported to the Nintendo Entertainment System and X68000 by different developers.

Rally Bike was met with mixed reception from video game magazines and dedicated outlets that reviewed the game when it launched in arcades and its ports. As of 2019, the rights to the title is owned by Tatsujin, a company founded in 2017 by former Toaplan member Masahiro Yuge and now-affiliate of Japanese arcade manufacturer exA-Arcadia alongside many other Toaplan IPs.

Gameplay 

Rally Bike is a top-down motorcycle road racing game where players observe from above and races across six increasingly difficult stages, along with two bonus stages, taking place in North America with the main objective of crossing the finish line by passing an established number of competitors before doing so. Along the way, players must also dodge incoming obstacles scattered on the stages to avoid any accident, which causes a great reduction of fuel.

Fuel is a major obstacle of the game as well, as players must refuel their bike by stopping at the filling station, however this will also cause competitors to take advantage, as they never run out of fuel and running out of it results in a game over unless more credits are inserted into the arcade machine to continue playing.

On occasions, a helicopter will come and drop an item to the road during races, ranging from turbo (which can be increased a second time by picking up the turbo item again) to helper bikers that guards the players from crashing against rival racers. In the NES version, a shop mechanic where players can buy new parts to improve their vehicle is introduced after completing each race. The title uses a checkpoint system in which a single player will respawn at the beginning of the checkpoint they managed to reach before crashing.

Release 
Rally Bike was released in arcades worldwide in May 1988 by Taito. The soundtrack was composed by Osamu Ōta under the alias "Ree". On 25 June 1989, an album containing music from Rally Bike and other Toaplan games was published exclusively in Japan by Datam Polystar.

Ports 
On 15 June 1990, a Nintendo Entertainment System port of Rally Bike developed by Visco Corporation was first released in Japan and later in North America by Romstar on September of the same year. The NES version does not keep the same stages and backgrounds, likely due to hardware limitations. On 23 May 1991, The title later received a faithful conversion to the Sharp X68000 by SPS and only published in Japan by Sharp Corporation, although it contains several minor differences when compared to the original version such as the modified aspect ratio, missing animations, among other changes. A Mega Drive conversion was in development alongside Slap Fight MD by M.N.M Software, but it never released.

Reception and legacy 

In Japan, Game Machine listed Rally Bike on their July 1, 1988 issue as being the second most-popular arcade game at the time. The game received mixed response from critics since its release in arcades. Commodore User criticized the controls but praised the graphics. Both Robin Hogg and Cameron Pound from The Games Machine commended the presentation, visuals and gameplay but noted the design in later levels to be one of the game's negative points. Andy Smith of ACE regarded the title as "challenging stuff that's bound to appeal to driving and racing fans". Anthony Baize of AllGame deemed it to be a difficult but enjoyable experience.

Other ports of Rally Bike were met with mixed reception from reviewers. Public reception was also mixed: readers of Famimaga voted to give the Nintendo Entertainment System version a 15.75 out of 30 score in a poll. However, the X68000 version proved to be relatively popular.

In more recent years, the rights to the game and many other IPs from Toaplan are now owned by Tatsujin, a company named after Truxton's Japanese title that was founded in 2017 by former Toaplan employee Masahiro Yuge, who are now affiliated with arcade manufacturer exA-Arcadia.

Notes

References

External links 
 Rally Bike at GameFAQs
 Rally Bike at Killer List of Videogames
 Rally Bike at MobyGames
 Rally Bike at The Toaplan Museum

1988 video games
Arcade video games
Cancelled Sega Genesis games
Motorcycle video games
Multiplayer and single-player video games
Nintendo Entertainment System games
Racing video games
Romstar games
X68000 games
Taito games
Toaplan games
Top-down racing video games
Video games developed in Japan
Video games scored by Osamu Ōta
Video games set in the United States
Visco Corporation games
Taito arcade games